Palau Robert is a building on Barcelona's Passeig de Gràcia 107, the former private residence of Robert Robert i Surís, an influential aristocrat, politician and businessman at the turn of the 20th century. It's now a government-run institution that hosts an exhibition centre with three halls, a concert hall, a public swimming pool and gardens as well as the Information Centre for Catalonia, including the city's tourism bureau. In the 1936–1939 period, it was the site of the Generalitat de Catalunya's Ministry of Culture. After the Spanish Civil War, Robert's family regained the Palau, until its second purchase by the Generalitat de Catalunya (the Catalan government) in 1981, when it became a public building.

The building
An example of late neoclassical style, made of stone from Montgrí, the Palau Robert was finished in 1903 under the direction of architects Henry Grandpierre and Joan Martorell i Montells. The garden was designed by Ramon Oliva, who also designed Plaça Catalunya. Its palm trees were brought during the 1888 Barcelona Universal Exposition.

Transport
The nearest Barcelona Metro station is Diagonal, and the FGC station Provença, on lines L3, L5, L6, L7, S1, S2, S5 and S55. The station's exit is adjacent to the Palau Robert. 
Bus lines stopping nearby are: 6, 7, 15, 16, 17, 22, 24, 28, 33 and 34.

See also
List of museums in Barcelona
List of theatres and concert halls in Barcelona

External links

Official Website
BCN Internet.com
Barcelona.vivelaciudad.es

Eixample
Passeig de Gràcia
Avinguda Diagonal
Palaces in Barcelona
Culture in Barcelona
Theatres and concert halls in Barcelona